The Columbus Senators Minor league baseball team was created in  as a founding member of the Tri-State League. After that, the Senators played in the  Western League (1897-1899), Interstate League (1900), Western Association (1901), and American Association (1902–1930). The team represented Columbus, Ohio, and played their home games at Recreation Park and Neil Park.

In their first season, the Senators finished in third place with a 64-50 record. The nickname was used again in 1897, when the Columbus team in the Western League changed its name from the Columbus Buckeyes to the Senators. Columbus competed until 1899, when the team had to move before the season was completed. In 1900, Columbus also had a Senators club in the Interstate League, moving to the Western Association in 1901.

By 1902, the Senators became one of the founding members of the new American Association. Before the 1905 season, the team owner built Neil Park, the first concrete-and-steel stadium in the minor leagues. From 1905 through 1907, the Senators won the league title, losing the Junior World Series in 1906 and 1907. The team declined after that, and never finished higher than fourth place between 1919 and 1930. The 1905 Senators were recognized as one of the 100 greatest minor league teams of all time.

In 1931, the St. Louis Cardinals took control of the Columbus team as part of their developing minor league system and renamed them the Columbus Red Birds.

Season-by-season records

Hall of Fame alumni
 Mordecai Brown (1917-1918)
 Rick Ferrell (1926-1928) 
 Joe Tinker (1917) 
 Dazzy Vance (1916)
 Rube Waddell (1899)

Reference
Specific

General
 The American Association: A Baseball History, 1902-1991 – Bill O'Neal. Publisher: Eakin Press, 1992.  Language: English. Format: Paperback, 410pp. 
 Encyclopedia of Minor League Baseball – Lloyd Johnson, Miles Wolff. Publisher: Baseball America, 1993. Language: English. Format: Paperback, 420pp. 

Defunct minor league baseball teams
Defunct American Association (1902–1997) teams
Defunct baseball teams in Ohio
Baseball teams in Columbus, Ohio
Defunct Tri-State League teams
Baseball teams disestablished in 1930
Baseball teams established in 1888
Defunct Western Association teams